Touch Yello is the 12th studio album by Swiss electronic band Yello. The record was released on October 2, 2009, through Polydor Records label.

Track listing

Track listing: Re-released on 2009, December 4, with 6 bonus tracks + the DVD The Virtual Concert

Personnel
Composed, Arranged, Engineered by Boris Blank 
Lyrics by Dieter Meier 
Vocals, Composed [Vocal Melodies] by Boris Blank, Dieter Meier 
Mastered by Ursli Weber 
Photography by Dieter Meier, Johannes Ritter, Martin Wanner, Roman Lehmann 
Design [Cover] by Martin Wanner 
Producer – Yello 
℗ & © 2009 Yello, under exclusive license to Universal Music Domestic Pop, a division of Universal Music GmbH.

Chart performance

Certifications

References

External links
Touch Yello on electronicbeats.net

2009 albums
Yello albums
Polydor Records albums